The Continental IO-360 is a family of fuel-injected air-cooled, horizontally opposed six-cylinder aircraft engines manufactured by Continental Motors in the United States of America, now part of AVIC International since 2010.

The engine is available in both naturally aspirated, fuel injected IO-360 models and turbocharged TSIO-360 versions. It is also available in both left and right hand rotation versions for use on twin-engined aircraft.

There was no carbureted version of this engine, which would have been designation O-360, therefore the base model is the IO-360.

History
The IO-360 was first certified by the Federal Aviation Administration on 15 May 1962 to the CAR 13 certification standard, effective June 15, 1956, as amended by 13-1 thru 13–3. The engine is produced by Continental under Production Certificate No. 508.

The turbocharged TSIO-360 series was first certified on 11 October 1966 to the Federal Aviation Regulations Part 33 standard effective February 1, 1965, as amended by 33–1. This series is manufactured under Production Certificate No. 7, except the TSIO-360-D which is under Production Certificate No. 508.

Variants

IO-360
IO-360-A
 at 2800 rpm, Minimum fuel grade 100 or 100LL avgas, compression ratio 8.5:1. Base IO-360 model: a six-cylinder air-cooled, horizontally opposed direct drive, fuel injected engine. Uses a TCM 639230A3 fuel injector. The crankshaft has two 6th order dampers.
IO-360-AB
 at 2800 rpm, Minimum fuel grade 100 or 100LL avgas, compression ratio 8.5:1. Uses a TCM 639230A3 fuel injector. Same as the IO-360-A except for modified crankshaft. The crankshaft has one 6th and one 4½ order damper.

IO-360-AF
, designed to run on lower octane fuels such as the proposed 94UL avgas. The designation of "AF" stands for alternative fuel. The version incorporates lower-compression pistons, giving a 7.5 to 1 compression ratio and a revised fuel injection system.
IO-360-B
 at 2700 rpm, Minimum fuel grade 80/87 avgas, compression ratio 6.0:1. Uses a TCM 639230A3 or 6006 fuel injector. Same as IO-360-A except for reduced compression ratio and rated power. The crankshaft has two 6th order dampers.
IO-360-C
 at 2800 rpm, Minimum fuel grade 100 or 100LL avgas, compression ratio 8.5:1. Uses a TCM 639231A3 fuel injector. Same as the IO-360-D except for accessory drive provisions. The crankshaft has two 6th order dampers.
IO-360-CB
 at 2800 rpm, Minimum fuel grade 100 or 100LL avgas, compression ratio 8.5:1. Uses a TCM 639231A3 fuel injector. Same as the IO-360-C except for modified crankshaft. The crankshaft has one 6th and one 4½ order damper.
IO-360-D
 at 2800 rpm, Minimum fuel grade 100 or 100LL avgas, compression ratio 8.5:1. Uses a TCM 639231A3 fuel injector. Same as the IO-360-A except for power rating and oil cooled pistons. The crankshaft has two 6th order dampers.
Rolls-Royce Continental IO-360-D
Licence production in the United Kingdom by Rolls-Royce
IO-360-DB
 at 2800 rpm, Minimum fuel grade 100 or 100LL avgas, compression ratio 8.5:1. Uses a TCM 639231A3 fuel injector. Same as the IO-360-D except for modified crankshaft. The crankshaft has one 6th and one 4½ order damper.
IO-360-E
 at 2800 rpm, Minimum fuel grade 100 or 100LL avgas, compression ratio 8.5:1. Uses a TCM 639231A3 fuel injector. Same as the IO-360-D except for oil sump and suction tube. The crankshaft has two 6th order dampers.
 
IO-360-ES
 at 2800 rpm, Minimum fuel grade 100 or 100LL avgas, compression ratio 8.5:1. Same as the IO-360-HB except for the modified spider induction system and the use of a TCM 639289A95 fuel injector. The crankshaft has one 6th and one 4½ order damper.
IO-360-G
 at 2800 rpm, Minimum fuel grade 100 or 100LL avgas, compression ratio 8.5:1. Uses a TCM 639231A3 fuel injector. Same as the IO-360-C except for crankshaft counterweight tuning. The crankshaft has one 6th and one 4½ order damper.
IO-360-GB
 at 2800 rpm, Minimum fuel grade 100 or 100LL avgas, compression ratio 8.5:1. Uses a TCM 639231A3 fuel injector. Same as the IO-360-G except for modified crankshaft. The crankshaft has one 6th and one 4½ order damper.
IO-360-H
 at 2800 rpm, Minimum fuel grade 100 or 100LL avgas, compression ratio 8.5:1. Uses a TCM 639231A3 fuel injector. Same as the IO-360-D except for crankshaft counterweight tuning. The crankshaft has one 6th and one 4½ order damper.
IO-360-HB
 at 2800 rpm, Minimum fuel grade 100 or 100LL avgas, compression ratio 8.5:1. Uses a TCM 639231A3 fuel injector. Same as the IO-360-H except for modified crankshaft. The crankshaft has one 6th and one 4½ order damper.
IO-360-J
 at 2800 rpm, Minimum fuel grade 100 or 100LL avgas, compression ratio 8.5:1. Uses a TCM 639231A3 fuel injector. Same as the IO-360-H except for power rating. The crankshaft has one 6th and one 4½ order damper.
IO-360-JB
 at 2800 rpm, Minimum fuel grade 100 or 100LL avgas, compression ratio 8.5:1. Uses a TCM 639231A3 fuel injector. Same as the IO-360-J except for modified crankshaft. The crankshaft has one 6th and one 4½ order damper.
IO-360-K
 at 2600 rpm, Minimum fuel grade 100 or 100LL avgas, compression ratio 8.5:1. Uses a TCM 639231A3 fuel injector. Same as the IO-360-H except for power rating. The crankshaft has one 6th and one 4½ order damper.
IO-360-KB
 at 2600 rpm, Minimum fuel grade 100 or 100LL avgas, compression ratio 8.5:1. Uses a TCM 639231A3 fuel injector. Same as the IO-360-K except for modified crankshaft. The crankshaft has one 6th and one 4½ order damper.

TSIO-360
TSIO-360-A
 at 2800 rpm, Minimum fuel grade 100 or 100LL avgas, compression ratio 7.50:1. Base TSIO-360 model: a six-cylinder air-cooled, horizontally opposed direct drive, fuel injected, tuned induction, turbocharged engine with internal piston cooling oil jets.
TSIO-360-AB
 at 2800 rpm, Minimum fuel grade 100 or 100LL avgas, compression ratio 7.50:1. Same as the TSIO-360-A except for a modified crankshaft.
TSIO-360-B
 at 2800 rpm, Minimum fuel grade 100 or 100LL avgas, compression ratio 7.50:1. Same as the TSIO-360-A except for accessory drive provisions.
TSIO-360-BB
 at 2800 rpm, Minimum fuel grade 100 or 100LL avgas, compression ratio 7.50:1. Same as the TSIO-360-B except for modified crankshaft and different dampers.
TSIO-360-C
 at 2800 rpm, Minimum fuel grade 100 or 100LL avgas, compression ratio 7.50:1. Same as the TSIO-360-A except for rating, crankshaft dampers provision for cabin pressurization.
TSIO-360-CB
 at 2800 rpm, Minimum fuel grade 100 or 100LL avgas, compression ratio 7.50:1. Same as the TSIO-360-C except for a modified crankshaft.
TSIO-360-D
 at 2800 rpm, Minimum fuel grade 100 or 100LL avgas, compression ratio 7.50:1. Same as the TSIO-360-C except for cabin pressurization.
TSIO-360-DB
 at 2800 rpm, Minimum fuel grade 100 or 100LL avgas, compression ratio 7.50:1. Same as the TSIO-360-D except for a modified crankshaft.
TSIO-360-E
 at 2575 rpm, Minimum fuel grade 100 or 100LL avgas, compression ratio 7.50:1. Same as the TSIO-360-C except for rating, engine mounted turbocharger, freon compressor drive and cabin pressurization.
TSIO-360-EB
 at 2575 rpm, Minimum fuel grade 100 or 100LL avgas, compression ratio 7.50:1. Same as the TSIO-360-E except for a modified crankshaft.
TSIO-360-F
 at 2575 rpm, Minimum fuel grade 100 or 100LL avgas, compression ratio 7.50:1. Same as the TSIO-360-E except for the power output rating and the exhaust system configuration.
TSIO-360-FB
 at 2575 rpm, Minimum fuel grade 100 or 100LL avgas, compression ratio 7.50:1. Same as the TSIO-360-F except for a modified crankshaft.
TSIO-360-G
 at 2700 rpm, Minimum fuel grade 100 or 100LL avgas, compression ratio 7.50:1. Same as the TSIO-360-E except for the power output rating and the exhaust system configuration.
TSIO-360-GB
 at 2700 rpm, Minimum fuel grade 100 or 100LL avgas, compression ratio 7.50:1. Same as the TSIO-360-G except for a modified crankshaft.
TSIO-360-H
 at 2800 rpm, Minimum fuel grade 100 or 100LL avgas, compression ratio 7.50:1. Same as the TSIO-360-G except for rating and cabin pressurization.
TSIO-360-HB
 at 2800 rpm, Minimum fuel grade 100 or 100LL avgas, compression ratio 7.50:1. Same as the TSIO-360-H except for a modified crankshaft.
TSIO-360-JB
 at 2800 rpm, Minimum fuel grade 100 or 100LL avgas, compression ratio 7.50:1. Same as the TSIO-360-HB except for the increased power output rating.
TSIO-360-KB
 at 2800 rpm, Minimum fuel grade 100 or 100LL avgas, compression ratio 7.50:1. Same as the TSIO-360-EB except for the increased power output rating.
TSIO-360-LB
 at 2700 rpm, Minimum fuel grade 100 or 100LL avgas, compression ratio 7.50:1. Same as the TSIO-360-GB but with a larger throttle body, larger induction elbows, relocated overboost valve, magneto pressurization and an exhaust muffler.
TSIO-360-MB
 at 36" mp and 2700 rpm, Minimum fuel grade 100 or 100LL avgas, compression ratio 7.50:1. Same as the TSIO-360-LB except for intercooler, wastegate controller, maximum manifold pressure, and cluster manifold.
TSIO-360-NB
 at 2700 rpm, Minimum fuel grade 100 or 100LL avgas, compression ratio 7.50:1. Same as the TSIO-360-LB except for an intercooler.
TSIO-360-PB
 at 2600 rpm, Minimum fuel grade 100 or 100LL avgas, compression ratio 7.50:1. Same as the TSIO-360-MB but not equipped with an intercooler.
TSIO-360-RB
 at 2600 rpm, Minimum fuel grade 100 or 100LL avgas, RH95/130 or B95/130 CIS, compression ratio 7.50:1. Same as the TSIO-360-KB except the manifold pressure is controlled with a wastegate controller,  an intercooler is installed in the induction system, and uses a Precision Airmotive RSA-5AD2 fuel injection servo.
TSIO-360-SB
 at 39" mp and 2600 rpm, Minimum fuel grade 100 or 100LL avgas, compression ratio 7.50:1. Same as the TSIO-360-MB except for the manifold pressure, RPM, and power output rating.

LTSIO-360
LTSIO-360-E
 at 2575 rpm, Minimum fuel grade 100 or 100LL avgas, compression ratio 7.50:1. Same as the TSIO-360-E except for direction of rotation.
LTSIO-360-EB
 at 2575 rpm, Minimum fuel grade 100 or 100LL avgas, compression ratio 7.50:1. Same as the LTSIO-360-E except for a modified crankshaft.
LTSIO-360-KB
 at 2800 rpm, Minimum fuel grade 100 or 100LL avgas, compression ratio 7.50:1. Same as the LTSIO-360-EB except for the increased power output rating.
LTSIO-360-RB
 at 2600 rpm, Minimum fuel grade 100 or 100LL avgas, RH95/130 or B95/130 CIS, compression ratio 7.50:1. Same as the TSIO-360-RB except for direction of rotation.

Applications

Specifications (IO-360-A)

See also
List of aircraft engines

References

Notes

Bibliography
Taylor, J.W.R. (ed.). Jane's All the World's Aircraft 1976-77. London: Jane's, 1976. .

External links

Engine specification sheet

1960s aircraft piston engines
IO-360